Daniel Horlaville (22 September 1945 – 28 April 2019) was a French footballer who played as a midfielder. He was the only post-World War II amateur player to be capped for France.

Personal life 
He was the father of former professional footballer Christophe Horlaville.

Horlaville died on 28 April 2019.

External links

Profile on French federation official site
Profile

1945 births
2019 deaths
French footballers
France international footballers
Association football midfielders
Paris Saint-Germain F.C. players
Paris FC players
FC Rouen players
Ligue 1 players
Ligue 2 players
Footballers at the 1968 Summer Olympics
Olympic footballers of France
Competitors at the 1967 Mediterranean Games
Mediterranean Games gold medalists for France
US Quevilly-Rouen Métropole players
Footballers from Normandy
Sportspeople from Seine-Maritime
Mediterranean Games medalists in football